Šedivý (feminine Šedivá) is a Czech surname. Notable people with the surname include:

 Eduard Šedivý, Slovak ice hockey player
 Irena Šedivá, Czech athlete
 Jan Šedivý, Czech orienteer
 Jaroslav Šedivý, Czech politician
 Jaroslav Erno Šedivý, Czech rock drummer
 Jiří Šedivý, Czech politician
 Jiří Šedivý (born 1953), Czech general
 Marie Šedivá, Czech fencer
 Peter Šedivý, Slovak footballer
 Prokop František Šedivý, Czech playwright

Czech-language surnames